Mohammad or Muhammad Ilyas may refer to:

 Mohammad Ilyas (cricketer), former Pakistani Test cricketer
 Mohammad Ilyas (cricketer, born 1996), Pakistani cricketer for Lahore Blues
 Mohammad Ilyas (cricketer, born 1999), Pakistani cricketer for Peshawar
 Muhammad Ilyas Qadri, founder of Dawat-e-Islami
 Muhammad Ilyas Kandhlawi, founder of Tablighi Jamaat
 Muhammad Ilyas Kashmiri, senior al-Qaeda operative
 Muhammad Ilyas (politician), Indonesian diplomat